The 1978–79 SK Rapid Wien season was the 81st season in club history.

Squad

Squad and statistics

Squad statistics

Fixtures and results

League

Cup

UEFA Cup

References

1978-79 Rapid Wien Season
Rapid